Radio Fremantle (ACMA callsign: 6CCR) is an Australian community radio station in Western Australia. Established in 1987, the station broadcasts to the City of Fremantle, Cockburn, and Melville areas, from studios in Hamilton Hill alongside 91.3 SportFM. Radio Fremantle broadcasts a large variety of programs with a strong belief on local programming including local, youth and ethnic listeners. There is a varied range of specialist programs including, Jazz, Classical, Folk, Country, and West Australian music, these are aired alongside Variety programmes from Monday to Saturday. Radio Fremantle also provides a wide range of outside broadcasts. Sunday’s are dedicated to Fremantle's large ethnic audience including, African, Portuguese, Brazilian and the Serbian community. There is also a daily 'Collage' program that takes a look at the Arts and local issues, with different presenters each day. Radio Fremantle has over 70 different individual programmes, to include different audiences and interests. 

From 1987 to 2000 they broadcast on the 100.1fm frequency, their studios were located in the now Heritage listed former Police station based in East Fremantle.

References

External links

Radio stations in Perth, Western Australia
Community radio stations in Australia
Radio stations established in 1987